On March 10, 2009, Michael Kenneth McLendon, 28, fatally shot ten people and wounded six others between the communities of Kinston, Samson, and Geneva, Alabama.  McLendon's shooting spree was the deadliest mass shooting in Alabama's history.

McLendon first killed his mother and burned down her house in the town of Kinston. Traveling to Samson, he killed his maternal grandmother, uncle, two cousins, and others, and wounded six. When law enforcement reached him, McLendon committed suicide. He was said to have been depressed about lack of work; in a note he said that his mother's family was not giving him enough support.

Shootings
McLendon began his attacks at about 3:30 p.m. on March 10, 2009 at his mother's house where they lived in Kinston, a town of 540 residents. McLendon shot and killed his mother and their three dogs, and set the interior of the house on fire. He drove to his uncle's house in the small city of Samson, population about 2,000. There he shot his uncle, two cousins, a neighbor, and said neighbor's infant daughter, all of which were sitting on the porch of his uncle and aunt's house. His aunt escaped the shooting uninjured because she was inside the house, while the neighbor's four-month-old daughter survived her gunshot wounds. McLendon then went next door and shot and killed his maternal grandmother.

McLendon left his grandmother's home and started driving, shooting at people from his car. The first to die was 43-year-old Sonya Smith, a gas station attendant. McLendon next shot and killed Bruce Malloy, a 51-year-old motorist who drove past him. The last fatality was 24-year-old James Starling, whom McLendon shot in the back as he tried to get away. McLendon also shot and wounded four other persons trying to escape his attack. He drove along Highway 52 toward Geneva, continuing to shoot from his car, and eventually led police on a chase that ran .
 
Law enforcement officers at one point used the PIT maneuver on the suspect's car, but he shot at them with a rifle, wounding Geneva police chief Frankie Lindsey in the arm, and kept going. McLendon reached Reliable Building Products, owned by Ruskin Company, where he had worked in 2003. After engaging in a shootout with police, he committed suicide inside the building. He had so much ammunition in his car that he appeared to have intended to kill many more people. When law enforcement found McLendon dead from a gunshot, it was initially unclear whether the shot was self-inflicted. Later reports said he committed suicide.

The shooting spree lasted almost an hour before McLendon was found dead at 4:17 p.m. He was found to have been armed with a Soviet-made SKS and a Bushmaster. He also had at least one .38 caliber pistol, police said. He fired more than 200 rounds, police said at a news conference. A large amount of ammunition was found in his car.

Victims
Among the victims were the suspect's mother and relatives from his maternal side: grandmother, uncle, and two cousins, as well as Andrea and Corinne Myers, the neighbor wife and daughter of deputy sheriff Josh Myers. Only the four-month-old Ella Myers, who was wounded, survived McLendon's shooting of the people sitting on the porch. Myers' four-year-old son was in the house and survived unharmed. His uncle and aunt had largely raised McLendon. His victims ranged in age from 18 months to 74 years old.

In addition, McLendon shot from his car after he fled, killing strangers. According to a local police officer:

The victims were:

Perpetrator

Michael Kenneth McLendon (September 19, 1980 – March 10, 2009) was born in southern Alabama to Lisa McLendon (née White) and her husband. After his parents divorced, he was largely raised by his aunt and maternal uncle, Phyllis and James White, of Samson, Alabama. He attended local schools. An "A" student in high school, he was known for being quiet; he graduated in 1999.

Unmarried, McLendon lived with his mother at her home in Kinston. This area of southern Alabama has had a depressed economy following the relocation of textile jobs overseas several years before. McLendon's work history showed a pattern of short tenure at jobs. He worked briefly with the police department in Samson, but failed to complete basic training at the state academy, washing out after a "week and a half." He had worked at the Reliable Products warehouse in Geneva, where he was asked to leave in 2003. He and his mother had worked at Pilgrim Foods, a poultry plant, and had filed suit with other workers when they were suspended in 2006.

Most recently, McLendon worked at Kelley Foods, a sausage factory, but quit the job abruptly the Wednesday before the shootings. Supervisors there said that he was a team leader and well-liked.

Motive
Witnesses said that McLendon was disturbed by his parents' divorce years ago, and had been depressed about his failure to start a career and disappointed that he had failed to qualify for the U.S. Marines or law enforcement. He had recently complained that his mother was not getting enough support from her family. At the time of the shooting, officials did not know where his father was. Detectives discovered a handwritten list by McLendon in his home which identified several people from previous jobs, with notations about their actions or comments against him, described as people who "had either disciplined him or had reported him to supervisors for work related infractions". The Alabama Bureau of Investigation noted that none of the people named in the list were among those he killed, but police were trying to determine if he had intended to attack them.

Investigators found a letter in which McLendon said he had killed his mother and planned to commit suicide. The letter also noted he was having a dispute over a legal issue with his mother's family, as they held a family Bible that he wanted. He said that he and his mother had "suffered enough".

McLendon was described as very familiar with guns. The investigators "found dozens of ammunition boxes, military and survival gear and medical supplies at McLendon's Kinston home".

Federal troops
In response to a request for assistance from the Geneva County Sheriff's Office and Samson Police, United States Army officers ordered federal troops from nearby Fort Rucker to be deployed to the streets of Samson. They manned traffic stops and guarded a makeshift morgue. An Army investigation later determined this action to be in violation of the Posse Comitatus Act, which prohibits federal troops from performing domestic law enforcement actions. The Army took administrative action against at least one officer.

Reactions
The Andalusia radio station WAAO-FM organized a fund-raising event to benefit the victims' families. Their goal was $10,000 with the event; more than $47,000 in cash, plus donations of caskets and concrete vaults for each of the victims, brought the total value of donations to more than $100,000.

See also
 List of rampage killers in the United States
 Gun violence in the United States
 Gun law in the United States
 Gun politics in the United States
 Mass shootings in the United States

References

2009 active shooter incidents in the United States
2009 in Alabama
2009 mass shootings in the United States
2009 murders in the United States
Arson in Alabama
Attacks in the United States in 2009
Coffee County, Alabama
Crimes in Alabama
Deaths by firearm in Alabama
Familicides
Geneva County, Alabama
March 2009 crimes in the United States
Mass murder in 2009
Mass shootings in Alabama
Murder in Alabama
Murder–suicides in Alabama
Mass shootings in the United States
Spree shootings in the United States
Suicides by firearm in Alabama